The Lola T93/00 is an highly successful open-wheel racing car chassis, designed and built by Lola Cars that competed in the CART open-wheel racing series, for competition in the 1993 season. It was extremely competitive, winning 8 races that season, including a win for rookie Nigel Mansell on debut in Australia. It also gave teammate Mario Andretti a win, as well as giving Al Unser Jr. and Danny Sullivan a win each. It was mainly powered by the  Ford/Cosworth XB turbo engine. It powered Nigel Mansell to his maiden first and only IndyCar World Championship.

References 

Open wheel racing cars
American Championship racing cars
Lola racing cars